Delaunois is a surname. Notable people with the surname include:

 Angèle Delaunois (born 1946), Canadian author
 Ghislain Delaunois (1923–1992), Belgian fencer
 Raymonde Delaunois (1885–1984), Belgian opera singer